Frutillaria is a genus of flies belonging to the family Lesser Dung flies.

Species
F. abdita Kits & Marshall, 2011
F. anticura Kits & Marshall, 2011
F. calceata Richards, 1961
F. calida Kits & Marshall, 2011
F. cheupuensis Richards, 1961
F. chiloensis Kits & Marshall, 2011
F. contulmo Kits & Marshall, 2011
F. edenensis Richards, 1961
F. furcata Kits & Marshall, 2011
F. glabra Kits & Marshall, 2011
F. kuscheli Richards, 1961
F. propinqua Richards, 1964
F. richardsi Kits & Marshall, 2011
F. stenoptera Richards, 1961
F. tenuiforceps Richards, 1964
F. transversa Kits & Marshall, 2011
F. triangularis Richards, 1964

References

Sphaeroceridae
Diptera of South America
Schizophora genera